William E. Simms (born William Elliott Simms; January 2, 1822 – June 25, 1898) was a U.S. Representative from Kentucky. He also served as a commissioner for the Confederate government of Kentucky and in several posts in the Confederate States government during the American Civil War.

Biography
Simms was born in Harrison County, Kentucky. He attended the public schools, and was graduated from the law department of Transylvania University in Lexington, Kentucky, in 1846. He was admitted to the bar in 1846 and commenced practice in Paris, Kentucky.

Simms served as a captain in the United States Army throughout the Mexican War, and was elected to the Kentucky House of Representatives from 1849 to 1851. He was elected as a Democrat to the Thirty-sixth Congress (March 4, 1859 – March 3, 1861), but unsuccessfully ran for reelection in 1860.

On October 21, 1861, Simms was appointed to the temporary rank of colonel in the Confederate States Army. He was appointed lieutenant colonel in the Provisional Army of the Confederate States on December 24, 1861, and was assigned to the First Battalion, Kentucky Cavalry. He resigned his commission on February 17, 1862, having been chosen as one of two senators from Kentucky to the Confederate States Congress. He was a member of the Senate of the First and Second Confederate Congresses and also served in President Davis' Cabinet.

After the war, he engaged in agricultural pursuits, and died on his estate, "Mount Airy," near Paris, Kentucky, on June 25, 1898. He is interred in Paris Cemetery.

Notes

References
  Retrieved on 2008-10-19
 
 William E. Simms at The Political Graveyard

Further reading

External links
 

1822 births
1898 deaths
19th-century American politicians
American military personnel of the Mexican–American War
Burials in Kentucky
Confederate States Army officers
Confederate States of America senators
Democratic Party members of the United States House of Representatives from Kentucky
Kentucky lawyers
Democratic Party members of the Kentucky House of Representatives
People from Harrison County, Kentucky
People of Kentucky in the American Civil War
Transylvania University alumni
United States Army officers
19th-century American lawyers